Jess Mackenzie Kerr (born 18 January 1998) is a New Zealand cricketer who plays for Wellington Blaze in domestic cricket.

Career
On 16 January 2020, she was named in New Zealand's  Women's Twenty20 International (WT20I) and Women's One Day International (WODI) squad against South Africa. She made her WODI debut for New Zealand on 27 January 2020. Later the same month, she was named in New Zealand's squad for the 2020 ICC Women's T20 World Cup in Australia. She made her WT20I debut for New Zealand, against South Africa, on 9 February 2020. In June 2020, Kerr was awarded with a central contract by New Zealand Cricket ahead of the 2020–21 season.

In February 2022, she was named in New Zealand's team for the 2022 Women's Cricket World Cup in New Zealand. In June 2022, Kerr was named in New Zealand's team for the cricket tournament at the 2022 Commonwealth Games in Birmingham, England, but was later ruled out of the tournament.

Family
Kerr's mother Jo and father Robbie both played cricket at domestic level representing Wellington. Her younger sister is Amelia Kerr, who plays for New Zealand. Her grandfather, Bruce Murray, played Test cricket for New Zealand. Her cousin, Cilla Duncan, represented New Zealand (Football Ferns) at international football.

Outside cricket 
Jess is a teacher in Tawa Intermediate, her and Amelia's former school, where Amelia is a teacher aide for autistic students.

References

External links
 

1998 births
Living people
New Zealand women cricketers
New Zealand women Twenty20 International cricketers
New Zealand women One Day International cricketers
Cricketers from Wellington City
Wellington Blaze cricketers
Brisbane Heat (WBBL) cricketers